Joni Seinelä (born March 23, 1993) is a Finnish ice hockey player. His is currently playing with HC TPS in the Finnish SM-liiga.

Seinelä made his SM-liiga debut playing with HC TPS during the 2011–12 SM-liiga season.

References

External links

1993 births
Living people
Finnish ice hockey right wingers
HC TPS players
Sportspeople from Turku